Esrom Nyandoro (born 6 February 1980 in Bulawayo) is a former Zimbabwean football midfielder. In his native Zimbabwe, Nyandoro is nicknamed "Yellowman".

Club career
Nyandoro grew up in Zimbabwe's second largest city, Bulawayo, and learnt at Mzilikazi High School. He was identified by soccer scouts whilst playing in the Peter Ndlovu invitational under 19 tournament, for Zimbabwe Saints Juniors, which was used to identify and promote talent. As a result of this he signed with AmaZulu, rising through the reserve ranks to being a member of the league championship winning squad.

Nyandoro was then signed by South African club Mamelodi Sundowns in 2004 and was named the PSL Club Rookie of the Year after his debut season.

In the summer of 2006, Nyandoro joined up with English Premier League club Sheffield United for a trial. This was on the recommendation of Peter Ndlovu who had played for the club. Nyandoro was however not signed.

International career
Nyandoro was a member of the Zimbabwean 2004 African Nations Cup team, who finished bottom of their group in the first round of competition, thus failing to secure qualification for the quarter-finals. He scored a superb goal that was voted as the best goal of the tournament. He also participated at the 2006 African Nations Cup.

External links
 
 

1980 births
Living people
Zimbabwean footballers
Zimbabwean expatriate footballers
Zimbabwean expatriate sportspeople in South Africa
Zimbabwe international footballers
Association football midfielders
Mamelodi Sundowns F.C. players
Expatriate soccer players in South Africa
2004 African Cup of Nations players
2006 Africa Cup of Nations players
Sportspeople from Bulawayo
Alumni of Mzilikazi High School